King of Chicago is a set of two adventures published by Chaosium in 1994 for the horror role-playing game Call of Cthulhu, itself based on the stories of H.P. Lovecraft.

Description
King of Chicago contains two adventure that both feature gang wars from the 1920s:
"King of Chicago" is set in 1920s Chicago at the height of gang warfare resulting from Prohibition. Investigators get a call from a private investigator, but he is murdered before they arrive. Their investigation will uncover a plot by an underworld boss to try to free an old evil in order to rule the city.
"The Secret of Marseilles" is set in southern France in the 1920s, where the investigators are drawn into gang warfare when they witness a murder. The investigation will reveal that gangsters have joined forces with amphibious creatures from the sea.

Publication history
Chaosium first published the horror roleplaying game Call of Cthulhu in 1981, and subsequently released several editions and many adventures for it. King of Chicago is a 63-page softcover book that was designed by Ugo Bardi, Tadashi Ehara, Lynn Willis (credited as "L.N. Isynwill"), and Gary Sumpter, with interior art by Earl Geier, and cover art by Charlie Krank.

Reception
In Issue 214 of Dragon (February 1995), Rick Swan admired the "Smart stories [and] authentic atmosphere." But he noted that as a result of too many gangsters, there were not many monsters.

Other reviews
Valkyrie #1 (Sept., 1994)
White Wolf Magazine Issue 40 (January 1994, p.7)

References

Call of Cthulhu (role-playing game) adventures
Role-playing game supplements introduced in 1994